Al-Aminah Floating Mosque (Masjid Terapung Al-Aminah) is a mosque located 300 meters from the coast of Sari Ringgung beach, Padang Cermin district, Pesawaran Regency, Lampung, Indonesia. The mosque is floating on water with sustenance by some buoys and anchors so as not to drift. It was originally functioned as a facility of worshiping for fishermen who are still in the sea. Initial construction was in 2012, and it was renovated in 2014, and inaugurated as a tourist attraction in Lampung in 2015 with the attendance of vice-governor Bachtiar Basri.

References 

Lampung
Mosques completed in 2012
Mosques in Indonesia
Tourist attractions in Lampung